Gommerville is a commune in the Seine-Maritime department in the Normandy region in northern France.

Geography
Junction 6 of the A29 autoroute is within the boundary of the commune.

Heraldry

Population

Places of interest
 The church of St.Martin, dating from the twelfth century.
 The remains of a feudal chateau.
 The Château de Filières , open to the public.
 The chateau Joly.
 A sixteenth century manorhouse at Rebomare.

See also
Communes of the Seine-Maritime department

References

External links

Gommerville on the Quid website 

Communes of Seine-Maritime